Laura Perls (née Lore Posner; 15 August 1905 in Pforzheim – 13 July 1990 in Pforzheim) was a noted German-born psychologist and psychotherapist who helped establish the Gestalt school of psychotherapy. She was the wife of Friedrich (Frederick) Perls, also a renowned psychotherapist and psychiatrist.

Background 
Posner was born to a wealthy family in 1905; born the daughter of a prosperous merchant. At the age of five, she began to play piano and demonstrated professional mastery by the time she was 18. Later, music and dance would be integrated into her therapy. She became interested in psychology when she was 16 (Fadiman & Frager, 2002). During her times as a student Laura took studied with Paul Tillich and Martin Buber, which she then studied work of psychologists who'd formed a gestalt school.Like many before and after her, her interest began after reading Freud's 1899 The Interpretation of Dreams (Fadiman & Frager, 2002). When she became a psychoanalyst, she was already prepared to pursue a career as a pianist, attended law school, and completed a degree in Gestalt psychology. She also obtained a doctorate in science from Frankfurt University in Germany. 

In 1930 she married Friedrich (Fritz) Perls. They had met while working at the Frankfurt Psychological Institute. The couple had two children, a daughter, Renate Perls, and a son, Stephen Perls, who is also a psychologist, in Alburquerque. At a later time Larura returned back to her birthplace, in Pforzhiem to be closer with her daughter. 

In 1933 the Perlses had to flee Germany during the rise of Nazism. They then spent thirteen years in South Africa. It was there that the Perlses wrote their first book together, Ego, Hunger and Aggression: A Revision of Freud's Theory and Method, published in 1942. This work held the beginnings for their new theory of psychotherapy, Gestalt Therapy, which consisted of facing the client to notice his or her postures and gestures (Fadiman & Frager, 2002). The Perlses also established the South African Institute for Psychoanalysis in 1935 and Fritz worked for the South African army in the war against the Nazis. Laura and her husband, Frits Perls worked on developing a theory and technique called Gestalt therapy. The Gestalt therapy is a blend between Freud and Wilhelm Reich psychodrama. 

In 1951, having moved to New York, the Perlses, together with Paul Goodman and Ralph Hefferline published Gestalt Therapy: Excitement and Growth in the Human Personality. By 1952, with the help of Paul Goodman, they had established The New York Institute for Gestalt Therapy (Fadiman & Frager, 2002). During this time in New York City Laura was seen as the mainstay. While the books were being published Laura was an unacknowledged contributor.   

When, in the early 1960s, Fritz Perls settled into a residency at the Esalen Institute in Big Sur, California, Laura stayed on in New York. She continued to run the original institute for nearly 30 more years, long after Fritz’s death. 

Laura Perls died in Pforzhiem, West Germany 1990 due to complications with her thyroid, one month before her 85th birthday. The English edition of her only book, Living at the Boundary, was published posthumously in 1992

References

External links
 Edward Rosenfeld: AN ORAL HISTORY OF GESTALT THERAPY. Part 1. A conversation with Laura Perls
The New York Institute for Gestalt Therapy, USA, founded by Fritz and Laura Perls, 1952
Laura Posner Perls.  In Memory.

1905 births
1990 deaths
German women psychologists
Gestalt therapists
Gestalt therapy
20th-century psychologists